William Pleydell-Bouverie may refer to:
 William Pleydell-Bouverie, 3rd Earl of Radnor, British peer
 William Pleydell-Bouverie, 5th Earl of Radnor, British politician
 William Pleydell-Bouverie, 7th Earl of Radnor, British peer